Sar Khalun (also Romanized as Sar Khalūn; also known as Deh Sar Khūn and Sar Khūn) is a village in Tayebi-ye Garmsiri-ye Shomali Rural District, in the Central District of Landeh County, Kohgiluyeh and Boyer-Ahmad Province, Iran. At the 2006 census, its population was 15, in 5 families.

References 

Populated places in Landeh County